HARMST is an acronym for high aspect ratio microstructure technology, which describes fabrication technologies,
used to create high-aspect-ratio microstructures with heights between tens of micrometers up to a centimeter, and aspect ratios greater than 10:1.  Examples include the LIGA fabrication process, advanced silicon etch, and deep reactive ion etching.

See also
 LIGA
 Micromechanical systems — high aspect ratio (HAR) micromachining

References

Materials science
Microtechnology